One Ninety One Peachtree Tower is a  50-story skyscraper in Atlanta, Georgia. Designed by Johnson/Burgee Architects and Kendall/Heaton Associates Inc, the building was completed in 1990 and is the fourth tallest in the city, winning the BOMA Building of the Year Awards the next year, repeating in 1998 and 2003.

Tenants and history

Throughout the 1990s 191 Peachtree was considered Atlanta's premier business address. However, when two of its largest tenants, law firm King & Spalding, and Wachovia moved to Midtown's new 1180 Peachtree and Atlantic Station respectively in 2006, most of the building was left vacant. That same year, Cousins Properties purchased the building from Equity Office Properties, which marked a return to 191 for the company as it helped originally develop the building.

The building is located on the former site of the Majestic Hotel, which in the early 20th century was one of the city's major hotels.

Design
The building was originally proposed in July 1987 at 48 floors. The building's facade is made of flame finished Rosa Dante granite and the windows are made of gray tinted glass. Each "tower" possesses a rooftop crown that is illuminated at night. The lighted double crown figured prominently in night footage filmed by helicopter during the 1996 Olympics. The primary entrance to the building is through a soaring 102-foot (7 stories / 31 m) tall atrium adjacent to Peachtree Street in Downtown Atlanta.

See also
 Architecture of Atlanta
 List of tallest buildings in Atlanta
 List of tallest buildings in the United States

References

External links

  at banyanstreet.com

John Burgee buildings
Office buildings completed in 1990
Skyscraper office buildings in Atlanta
Philip Johnson buildings